John R. Yates III is an American chemist and Ernest W. Hahn Professor in the Departments of Molecular Medicine and Neurobiology at The Scripps Research Institute in La Jolla, California. 

His work is focused on developing tools and in proteomics and he specializes in mass spectrometry.  He is best known for the development of the SEQUEST algorithm for automated peptide sequencing and Multidimensional Protein Identification Technology (MudPIT)  and data independent analysis (DIA). His laboratory has made important contributions to understanding the biochemical mechanisms behind the failure of DF508 cystic fibrosis ion transport regulator (CFTR) to mature.

References

External links
Page at Scripps
Lab page

21st-century American chemists
Mass spectrometrists
Living people
Scripps Research faculty
Year of birth missing (living people)
Thomson Medal recipients